M. V. Rajeev Gowda is an Indian politician and academician. He is a former member of parliament in the Rajya Sabha and a national spokesperson for the Indian National Congress. He also currently serves as Chairman of the "Congress Research Department". He was Professor of Economics and Social Sciences and the Chairperson of the Centre for Public Policy at the Indian Institute of Management, Bangalore and taught a range of courses. He served as the Director of the Central Board, Reserve Bank of India. He is currently the Advisor for Bridge India, a progressive non-profit think tank set up In London in 2018.

Personal life 

Rajeev Gowda was born into an eminent family in Bangalore and his father's and uncle's public lives influenced his own political ambitions. His late father M V Venkatappa, held the positions of Legislative Assembly Speaker and Chairman of the legislative council in the state of Karnataka. MV Venkatappa had worked as a member of Land Reforms Committee from 1972 to 1974 during the period of the Late Devaraj Urs.  He was also a prominent politician elected twice from the Mulbagal assembly constituency and member of the upper house of the assembly for two terms.  His wife and Rajeev Gowda's mother Subhadra is a social worker and has been President of the Karnataka Mahila Sabha. His late uncle M. V. Krishnappa was involved in India's freedom movement and was also the founder of the Bangalore Dairy. He was a minister in Jawaharlal Nehru's cabinet and was elected to the Lok Sabha six times.

In his youth, Rajeev Gowda was active in student politics and was the vice-president of the students union at St. Joseph's College, Bangalore. Later, he moved to the United States for his higher education and built his academic career there, attaining tenure as a professor at the University of Oklahoma before moving back to India after more than 16 years abroad to teach at the Indian Institute of Management, Bangalore and pursue his political ambitions.

Rajeev Gowda is married to Sharmila Bhaktaram.

Education 

Prof. Gowda studied economics and political science at St. Joseph's College, Bangalore, where he was elected as the Vice-President of the Student Union in 1982–83. He was awarded the Bangalore University gold medal in political science and secured a fully funded scholarship to pursue Masters in Economics in Fordham University, New York. Prof. Gowda holds a PhD in Public Policy & Management from Wharton School, University of Pennsylvania, USA. He was also a Post- Doctoral Fellow in Law & Economics from University of Berkeley, California.

Professional career 

In 1991, Rajeev Gowda was awarded the John M. Olin Post-doctoral Fellow in Law and Economics- Law School (Boalt Hall), University of California, Berkeley, USA. He was a visiting scholar at the Center for Jurisprudence and Social Policy- Law School (Boalt Hall), University of California. In the year 1992, he joined the University of Oklahoma as Assistant Professor of Political Science. From 1999 to 2000 he held the positions of Associate Professor of Political Science and Research Fellow in Science and Public Policy at the University of Oklahoma. He was also the Coordinator, Interdisciplinary Perspectives on the Environment Program at the University in 1999. In 2000, he moved to India to help set up the Centre for Public Policy at Indian Institute of Management, Bangalore and was Chairperson of the centre. At present he is a professor at Indian Institute of Management, Bangalore.

His other professional appointments include being a Carnegie Council Global Ethics Fellow and a Member of the Central Board, Reserve Bank of India. He has also held the positions of Director, General Insurance Corporation of India, 2007–2010 and Member, Executive Council, Rajiv Gandhi National Institute of Youth Development, 2008–present. He has been an invited columnist for several publications including Deccan Herald, Economic Times, India Today, Times of India and Outlook.

Prof. Gowda also co-founded the acclaimed Karnataka Quiz Association in 1983, and was the national runner up on BBC TV's Mastermind India in 2001.

Gowda is a renowned expert in election law. He contributed to the Routledge Handbook of Election Law.

Political career 

Rajeev Gowda was chosen to launch the Congress party's younger generation election campaign nationally in Guwahati, 2004.

At the Karnataka Pradesh Congress Committee, he is the official Spokesperson and Member of the Manifesto Committee. He was the Chairman of the BBMP Election Manifesto Drafting Committee, 2010 and an Ex-Convenor, Vichar Vibhag.

To strengthen the support base of the Congress online, Rajeev Gowda has co-founded and runs a pro-Congress blog site hamaracongress.com

In Parliament 

Prof. Gowda is a member of the following committees in his capacity as a Member of Parliament:
 Member, National Institute of Mental Health and Neuro-Sciences (NIMHANS), Bangalore (July 2014 – Present)
 Member, Committee on Human Resource Development (Sept. 2014–Present)
 Member, Committee on Subordinate Legislation (Sept. 2015–Present)
 Member, Court of the Jawaharlal Nehru University (Sept 2015–Present)
 Member, Select Committee of Rajya Sabha on the Real Estate (Regulation and Development) Bill, 2013 (May 2015 – Present)
 Member, Court of Manipur University (March 2016 – Present)

Newspaper columns

Highlighting various programs pioneered by the Congress party:

 On the youth fellowship with Prime Minister's Rural Development Fund, an outlook: “Our country's own peace corps”, Daily News Analysis, 28 November 2013
 Right to Education, every child's right as envisioned by Shri Pandit Jawaharlal Nehru: “An ideal birthday gift for Pandit Jawaharlal Nehru”, Daily News Analysis, 15 November 2013
 Distribution of Aakash tablets and making the internet available in rural areas: “Technology to transform teaching”, Vijaya Karnataka (Kannada newspaper), 18 September 2013
 Explaining and addressing the concerns expressed over the Food Security Bill: “Is the Food Security Bill a mere election gimmick?”, IBN Live, 27 August 2013

Elections, polls, statehood:

 Highlighting the necessity of banning public polls and opinion polls as directed by the Election Commission themselves: “EC has a point. Polls sway voters”, Daily News Analysis, 7 November 2013
 On the present condition of various states in India and the reason behind the formation of a separate Telangana state: “Rajyotsava: the celebration of Statehood”, Daily News Analysis, 1 November 2013
 Denunciation of ordinance on convicted lawmakers and the urgent need for electoral reforms: “Don't cripple clean politicians”, Times of India, 8 October 2013
 In-depth budget analysis and reasons for incorporation of subsidies: “A virtuous cycle will be unleashed”, Deccan Herald, 27 January 2013
 A career in politics is like an entrepreneurial venture, a dream with an unknown outcome, PaGaLGuY, 26 June 2012
 Right to Education is not just symbolic, Daily News analysis Newspaper, 5 August 2010

Karnataka Elections and the formation of people's government:

 The Congress government formation in Karnataka state and its implications: “Seven seats now, potential of 28 in 2014”, Business Today, 10 May 2013
 The next steps to be taken by the newly elected Congress government: “Agenda before Karnataka's new Government”, Business Line (The Hindu supplement), 9 May 2013
 The need to vote for a sustainable democracy: “Should more people vote? Then, let's revive the festival of democracy”, Times of India, 3 May 2013
 Answering various queries of the youth with regard to the May 2013 Karnataka state elections: Q&A: Karnataka Assembly polls, IBN Live, 11 April 2013 
 A trip to the turbulent Karnataka political history: “Descent into democratic decadence”, Indiaseminar.com, 13 July 2011

Women's Safety: a high priority:

 Various women oriented NGO's unite to fight against injustice and moral policing: “A billion high fives for inclusiveness”, Times of India, 14 February 2013
 Insight into the anti-rape laws in India, post the Delhi-gang rape incident: “Anti-Rape Legislation in India: The Name Game”, One India news portal, 4 January 2013
 Protesting against the Ram Sena league which threatens the freedom and rights of women on celebrating Valentine's Day: “The protest is a forum to stand up for one's rights”, Daily News Analysis, 11 February 2009

On the need for electoral and economic reforms:

 A review of the Monsoon parliamentary session:  “Five steps to make the Indian parliament more effective”, First Post news portal, 8 September 2013* Corruption in India and election expenditure laws: “The costs of democracy”, The Indian Express, 19 July 2013
 Initiatives to be taken by the UPA II for economic reforms: “It's time for UPA-II to retake the initiative”, The Financial Express, 31 December 2011
 Insight into the cost of fighting elections and being a politician: “Wages Of Democracy”, Outlook, 27 September 2009
 Consumer's perspective: Consumers slip on price flip, Deccan Herald, 11 July 2010
 Transforming Leadership, Economic Times, 7 December 2003
 Towards a realistic Economics, Economic Times, 19 October 2002

Opinions:

 The man that was: Nelson Mandela – a man who was free even in prison, Daily News Analysis Newspaper, 2 December 2013
 Being an alumnus of Wharton and its meaning: Wharton And All, Outlook India, 28 September 2013
 Notes from the campaign trail – 3. Media Perversions, Hamaracongress.com, 31 May 2010
 Sonia's new whizkid, rediff.com, 15 March 2004

Books

 Judgments, Decisions, and Public Policy: Behavioral Decision Theory Perspectives and Applications, (Editor, with Jeffrey Fox), New York: Cambridge University Press, 2002
 Integrating Insurance and Risk Management for Hazardous Wastes, (Co-editor, with Howard Kunreuther), Boston: Kluwer, 1990

References

External links
 https://timesofindia.indiatimes.com/india/rahul-gandhis-push-for-congresss-own-think-tank-to-drive-policy/articleshow/62404514.cms

1963 births
Living people
Indian political scientists
Indian National Congress politicians from Karnataka
Rajya Sabha members from Karnataka
Wharton School of the University of Pennsylvania alumni
Politicians from Bangalore
Scientists from Bangalore
Bangalore University alumni